Ras Al Khaimah Economic Zone (RAKEZ) is an Emirati free zone in Ras Al Khaimah in United Arab Emirates. In January 2020, Entrepreneur reported the free zone to have 14,000 companies across 50 industries. It was introduced in 2017 and is one of the 37 free zones across in the United Arab Emirates. During COVID-19 pandemic, RAKEZ moved towards digitisation and was reported to have 20% growth in 2020. The Free zone also launched a scheme to provide 12 years visa for investors purchasing an apartment in the zone in partnership with real estate developers Al Hamra. RAKEZ allows a one hundred percent foreign ownership.

References 

Free-trade zones of the United Arab Emirates